Forks Over Knives is a 2011 American advocacy film and documentary that advocates a low-fat, whole-food, plant-based diet (that excludes all animal products and processed foods) as a way to avoid or reverse several chronic diseases. The film recommends avoiding overly refined and processed foods, including refined sugars, bleached flours, and oils, and instead eating whole grains, legumes, tubers, vegetables, and fruits.

Summary 
Through an examination of the careers of American physician Caldwell Esselstyn and professor of nutritional biochemistry T. Colin Campbell, Forks Over Knives claims that many diseases, including obesity, cardiovascular diseases, and cancer, can be prevented and treated by eating a whole-food, plant-based diet, avoiding processed food and food from animals.

The film includes an overview of the 20-year China–Cornell–Oxford Project that led to Professor Campbell's findings, outlined in his book The China Study (2005), in which he suggests that coronary artery disease, diabetes, obesity, and cancer can be linked to the Western diet of processed and animal-based foods (including dairy products).

Reception 
On Rotten Tomatoes the film has an approval rating of 59% based on reviews from 37 critics. On Metacritic, the film had an average score of 57 out of 100, based on 18 reviews, indicating "mixed or average" reviews.

Roger Ebert of the Chicago Sun-Times gave the film three out of four stars and wrote: "here is a film that could save your life." He commented that "Forks Over Knives is not subtle. It plays as if it had been made for doctors to see in medical school." Loren King of The Boston Globe gave it three out of four stars and remarked that "what An Inconvenient Truth did for global warming, Lee Fulkerson's persuasive documentary does for a vegan diet". Carrie Rickey of The Philadelphia Inquirer gave the film three out of four stars and described it as "an earnest and fact-filled work of food evangelism."

Sean O'Connell of The Washington Post gave the film two out of four stars and argued that it is "an interesting and informative health lecture that's sandwiched into a dry, repetitive documentary" and said that "it's desperately in need of charisma, humor or personality to balance the steady stream of scientific facts we’re asked to absorb". Rex Reed of The New York Observer gave the film 2/4, criticizing its "funereal" tone and writing, "the movie says nothing we don't already know, and 96 minutes is too long to tell us how sick we are." Corey Hall of the Metro Times gave the film a "C" and stated that "while it's impossible to dispute the basic premise that eating more vegetables is good for you, Forks adopts a staunch anti-meat and -dairy stance that leaves the door open for criticism."

The film was awarded the Documentary/Special Interest Title of the Year in 2012 by the Entertainment Merchants Association.

Books 
 Alona Pulde M.D.,  Matthew Lederman M.D.  The Forks Over Knives Plan: How to Transition to the Life-Saving, Whole-Food, Plant-Based Diet, 2014.
 Sroufe, Del. Forks Over Knives—The Cookbook, 2012.
 Stone, Gene. Forks Over Knives: The Plant Based Way to Health, 2011.

See also
 List of vegan media

References

External links 
 
 
 

2011 films
2011 documentary films
2010s English-language films
American documentary films
Documentary films about environmental issues
Documentary films about animal rights
Vegetarianism in the United States
2010s American films
Documentary films about plant-food diets